The 2020–21 First Professional Football League, also known as efbet League for sponsorship reasons, was the 97th season of the top division of the Bulgarian football league system, the 73rd since a league format was adopted for the national competition of A Group as a top tier of the pyramid, and also the 5th season of the First Professional Football League, which decides the Bulgarian champion. Ludogorets Razgrad were the defending champions for the ninth consecutive time.

The season was initially set to start on 24 July 2020, but began on 7 August 2020 due to the COVID-19 situation in Bulgaria.

On 4 May 2021, Ludogorets Razgrad became champions for a record-breaking 10th consecutive time after winning 3–1 against Beroe.

Effects of the COVID-19 pandemic

Measures pertaining to fan attendance
All matches were at first envisioned to be held without spectators, at the minimum until 31 August, but this was reversed in early August (allowing for matches to be held at 50% stadium capacity and up to 1000 people per stand), reportedly under pressure from fan groups, with the government's inconsistency on the matter in turn criticized in certain circles. On 27 October 2020, Minister of Health Kostadin Angelov issued a decree valid from 29 October until 12 November, stipulating that all matches are to be held behind closed doors. Minister of Youth and Sports Krasen Kralev claimed that some of the fans of certain teams had not been observing the pandemic control protocols, such as social distancing and mask-wearing. On 12 November 2020, the ban on the presence of spectators was extended at least until 30 November. In late November 2020 Kralev stated that the return of fans will not be under consideration until March 2021. Spectators were once again allowed from 24 April 2021 onwards, at 30% stadium capacity, with a maximum of 1000 people per block. The capacity was expanded to 50% from 19 May 2021.

Footballers testing positive for the virus, schedule changes and vaccinations
Two Ludogorets Razgrad players tested positive for coronavirus just prior to the beginning of the championship. In September 2020, the whole Etar team was initially quarantined by the regional health authorities in Veliko Tarnovo after 5 footballers' and 2 staff members' PCR tests indicated that they were infected, but the match against Lokomotiv eventually went ahead without the date being changed. The fixture between Arda and Ludogorets Razgrad that was to be held on 4 October 2020 was postponed after more than 10 footballers' tests from the Kardzhali team (as well as a trainer) returned positive results. In late October 2020, Slavia also saw multiple footballers testing positive for COVID-19. In early November 2020, four Levski Sofia players were reported to have the infection. Prior to the start of the November international window, 12 Ludogorets footballers from both the first and the second teams as well as additional Levski Sofia players from the senior and junior rosters were diagnosed with the virus, bringing the total number of infected at the latter club to 16. This caused some of the players to miss out on national team call-ups and led to the postponement of Ludogorets' Bulgarian Cup match against Sportist Svoge and Levski Sofia's league game against Lokomotiv Plovdiv. Beroe also saw cases of coronavirus among its players. After initially given the green light to be held on the planned date, The Eternal Derby match originally scheduled for 21 November was eventually postponed as well, taking place on 18 December. After reporting a number of COVID-19 cases in July 2020, shortly before the beginning of the championship, CSKA 1948 saw a boom in infections in May 2021, with 11 footballers testing positive, resulting in the postponement of their first game from the championship group against Lokomotiv Plovdiv. CSKA 1948 requested that their match against CSKA Sofia (scheduled to be held on 7 May) is moved to a later date as well, but this was not granted by the Football Union. After CSKA 1948 did not show up for the game, on 10 May CSKA Sofia were awarded a 3:0 technical win by the Sports and Technical Commission. However, on 13 May 2021, the same technical body decided to honour CSKA 1948's appeal, also taking into account the dissatisfaction voiced by Lokomotiv Plovdiv due to competing with CSKA Sofia for the second place in the league standings, and rescheduled the game for 22 May 2021. Vaccinations among footballers and staff began in March 2021.

Innovations
The VAR system was introduced at the start of the post-regular season phase, being first used on 3 May 2021 for the match between CSKA Sofia and Arda.

Teams
Fourteen teams are competing in the league – the top eleven teams from the previous season, the team that finished in first place in the Second League, and the two winners of the promotion/relegation playoffs.

CSKA 1948 were promoted as champions of the 2019–20 Second League and will make their debut in the top tier of Bulgarian football. The second team to be promoted was Montana, who earned promotion after winning their play-off match against Dunav Ruse. The club returns after three seasons in the second tier, following their relegation in the 2016–17 season, while Dunav ended their four-year stay in the First League. In the third playoff, Tsarsko Selo remained in the top division by winning against Septemvri Sofia.

Stadiums and locations

Personnel and kits
Note: Flags indicate national team as has been defined under FIFA eligibility rules. Players and managers may hold more than one non-FIFA nationality.

Note: Individual clubs may wear jerseys with advertising. However, only one sponsorship is permitted per jersey for official tournaments organised by UEFA in addition to that of the kit manufacturer (exceptions are made for non-profit organisations).
Clubs in the domestic league can have more than one sponsorship per jersey which can feature on the front of the shirt, incorporated with the main sponsor or in place of it; or on the back, either below the squad number or on the collar area. Shorts also have space available for advertisement.

Managerial changes

Regular season

League table

Results

Positions by round

Results by round

Championship round

Championship round table
Points and goals will carry over in full from regular season.

Positions by round
Below the positions per round are shown. As teams did not all start with an equal number of points, the initial pre-playoffs positions are also given.

Europa Conference League round
Points and goals will carry over in full from regular season.

Europa Conference League round table

Positions by round
Below the positions per round are shown. As teams did not all start with an equal number of points, the initial pre-playoffs positions are also given.

Relegation round
Points and goals will carry over in full from regular season.

Relegation round table

Positions by round
Below the positions per round are shown. As teams did not all start with an equal number of points, the initial pre-playoffs positions are also given.

Europa Conference League play-off

Promotion/relegation play-off

Season statistics

Top scorers

Most assists

Clean sheets

Notes

References

First Professional Football League (Bulgaria) seasons
Bulgaria
1